At their peak, there were six Chinese Society Halls on Maui. Operated by the Gee Kung Tong Society, these halls were created to provide services to immigrant Chinese workers, mostly working for the sugarcane plantations. All provided religious and political help, in addition to mutual aid. Only the Wo Hing Society Hall in Lahaina and the Ket Hing Society Hall in Kula have survived. Both were placed on the Hawaii State Register of Historic Places on July 30, 1982, and placed on the National Register of Historic Places on November 15, 1982. The Chee Kung Tong Society Hall was placed onto both State and Federal registers, but collapsed in 1996.

Purpose
In 1852, many Chinese were brought to work on Hawaii's sugar plantations, mainly single men. When their contracts expired, some stayed behind and took up other trades. Due to the influx and distance from mainland China, Chinese Tong societies sprouted up to provide Chinese religious and political help, in addition to mutual aid, friendship, and funerary benefits upon death.

Six clubhouses or "Halls" were built. Two survive to this day, while the others have disappeared.

Chee Kung Tong

The Chee Kung Tong Society Hall was a former society hall located on 2151 Vineyard Street in Wailuku. County records indicate that the building was first listed as being built in 1897, thought other sources differ on the matter. It collapsed sometime on April 19, 1996. Today, the vacant lot sits derelict, with only a cement foundation and gate marking the site.

The site was placed on the Hawaii State Register of Historic Places on July 30, 1982 and the National Register of Historic Places on November 15, 1982, but delisted in August 1998 from the State register; it is still listed in the NRHP database.

Ket Hing Society Building

The Kwock Hing Society Hall (Ket Hing Society Building) is a two-story structure in Kula on Cross Road. It was erected in 1907  and was the first two-story structure in Kula. The current building that stands on the site is a replacement. It was placed on the Hawaii State Register of Historic Places on July 30, 1982 and the National Register of Historic Places on November 15, 1982 Numerous meetings were held at this site to support Dr. Sun Yat-sen. Near here, between mountains of Kula and the shoreline of Makena, Sun Mei, Dr. Sun Yat-sen's brother, once leased a large ranch from the Hawaiian monarchy.

Wo Hing Society Hall

The Wo Hing Society Hall is a building located on Front Street in Lahaina built around 1912. The two story structure and cookhouse served as both a meeting place for Chinese immigrants working in Lahaina and offered religious services on the second floor. The use of the hall declined by the 1940s when many Chinese left for business opportunities in Honolulu. The building was restored in 1983 with the help of the Lahaina Restoration Foundation. It currently operates to the public under the name of Wo Hing Museum.

The hall was placed on the Hawaii State Register of Historic Places on July 30, 1982 and the National Register of Historic Places on November 15, 1982.

Other halls
Three other halls are said to have existed at one time or another. They include:

Lin Hing Society Clubhouse in Ke'anae
Tow Yee Kwock  Society in Wailuku
Chee Kung Tong Society clubhouse in Kipahulu

The exact times of existence and closure are unknown.

References

Further reading

Clubhouses on the National Register of Historic Places in Hawaii
Culture of Maui
Chinese-American history
Properties of religious function on the National Register of Historic Places in Hawaii
Buildings and structures in Maui County, Hawaii
Clubhouses in Hawaii
Chinese-American culture in Hawaii
National Register of Historic Places in Maui County, Hawaii
Hawaii Register of Historic Places